Michael George Kailis  (14 February 1929 – 25 June 1999) was a West Australian businessman who founded the MG Kailis Group of companies, whose head office is in Fremantle, Western Australia.

In 1960 he and his wife Patricia Kailis started a small rock lobster operation in Dongara, later expanding their interests into prawning, shipbuilding, aquaculture and the Kailis Jewellery line, built on pearls.

Kailis's parents emigrated to Australia from the Greek island of Kastelorizo.

His brother, Peter, founded the Red Rooster fast food chain.

Notes

References
 Hansen Ian and Dorothy (1999) The captain's grandson : the world of Michael Kailis Fremantle, W.A. : Fremantle Arts Centre Press,  (pbk.)

1929 births
1999 deaths
Members of the Order of Australia
Australian Commanders of the Order of the British Empire
Australian people of Greek descent
People from Fremantle
20th-century Australian businesspeople